The Bendiksen Award, or Bendiksenprisen in Norwegian, is a music award granted by the Norwegian Ministry of Culture and awarded by the Norwegian Artists' Association, GramArt. The award was established in 2009. The Award is meant to contribute to the development of talent in Norwegian pop music industry, and "be a contribution to an artist that already has established a career, that either has one commercial release or conduct concert performances of a certain scale". The winner receives 100,000 Norwegian kroner. 

The award is named after Norwegian singer Arne Bendiksen.

Awards

 2010: Karpe Diem. Nominees: Susanne Sundfør, Marit Larsen, Shining and Donkeyboy. 
 2011: Ida Jenshus. Nominees: Lars Vaular, Thom Hell, Kvelertak and Montée.
 2012: Stein Torleif Bjella. Nominees: Katzenjammer, Jarle Bernhoft, LidoLido and Donkeyboy.
 2013: Monica Heldal. Nominees: LidoLido, Arve Henriksen, Frida Amundsen and Violet Road.
 2014: Highasakite. Nominees: Gabrielle, Oslo Ess, Bendik Brænne and Frida Ånnevik
 2015: Spidergawd. Nominees: Aurora, Cashmere Cat, Ine Hoem and OnklP & De Fjerne Slektningene.
 2016: Bow To Each Other. Nominees: Arne Hurlen (Postgirobygget), Bjørn Gunnar Sando (Hellbillies), Tove Bøygard Ivar S. Peersen (Enslaved), Knut Schreiner, Anne Lise Frøkedal, Karin Park og Sven Garås, Morten Skaget, and Hanne Sørvaag.

References

External links 
 Presentation of the award at GramArt's site

Norwegian music awards